Winged Life is Shearwater's third full-length album, released on March 16, 2004, on Misra Records.

Track listing
"A Hush" (Jonathan Meiburg) – 4:17
"My Good Deed" (Will Sheff) – 5:52
"Whipping Boy" (Jonathan Meiburg) – 4:42
"The Kind" (Jonathan Meiburg) – 2:50
"A Makeover" (Will Sheff) – 5:00
"St. Mary's Walk" (Jonathan Meiburg) – 3:15
"Wedding Bells Are Breaking up That Old Gang of Mine" (Will Sheff) – 6:26
"(I've Got a) Right to Cry" (Jonathan Meiburg) – 3:38
"The World in 1984" (Jonathan Meiburg) – 3:01
"The Convert" (Will Sheff) – 2:45
"Sealed" (Jonathan Meiburg) – 3:48
"The Set Table" (Will Sheff) – 6:40

References

External links
Misra Records
Official Shearwater site

2004 albums
Shearwater (band) albums